The Arboretum de Fresse-sur-Moselle (3 hectares) is an arboretum located in Fresse-sur-Moselle, Vosges, Grand Est, France. It contains about 150 varieties of trees.

See also 
 List of botanical gardens in France

References 
 L'Echo des Chênaies entry (French)
 AVEM Vosges entry (French)

Fresse-sur-Moselle, Arboretum de
Fresse-sur-Moselle, Arboretum de